WBHM (90.3 MHz) is a non-commercial public FM radio station in Birmingham, Alabama. The station is licensed to the University of Alabama at Birmingham, where it maintains its radio studios on 11th Street South.  WBHM features programming from National Public Radio, American Public Media and Public Radio Exchange.  On weekdays, it carries news and information programming, with classical music heard late nights, seven days a week.  Weekend programming includes public radio shows such as Wait, Wait, Don't Tell Me, On The Media, The Moth Radio Hour and Travel with Rick Steves, as well as Bluegrass music and New Age music.

WBHM has an effective radiated power (ERP) of 32,000 watts.  The transmitter is in Vulcan Park, amid towers for other Birmingham-area FM and TV stations.  It broadcasts using HD Radio technology.  On a digital subchannel, it operates the Alabama Radio Reading Service for blind and visually impaired listeners.  Articles from the Birmingham News and popular magazines are read on the service.  WBHM programming is also heard on 99 watt FM translator W291DC at 106.1 MHz in Birmingham.

History

Early Years
Even though Huntsville beat Birmingham, the state's largest city (in population), in getting Alabama's first public radio station in October 1976 (the present WLRH), WBHM did not follow far behind, beginning operations on December 5. WBHM became Birmingham's full-time classical music station since the demise of a commercial FM outlet, WSFM, which gave way to the present WDJC-FM in 1967.

By the 1990s, WBHM discontinued local classical hosts.  It switched to syndicated programming from the Classical Public Radio Network, a joint production of KUSC-FM Los Angeles and Colorado Public Radio. to provide programming in the middays, evenings, and overnight.  Weekday mornings and afternoons were dedicated to news and information programming, largely from National Public Radio.

When CPRN shut down operations in 2008, WBHM switched to an all-news/discussion format in the daytime hours with programming from PRI and NPR, a move that several other previously classical-formatted NPR affiliates elsewhere have made in recent times. Classical music is now heard on WBHM after 8 p.m. Mondays through Fridays, 10 p.m. on Saturdays and Midnight on Sundays. Also on Sunday nights, two long-running atmospheric music programs, Echoes and Hearts of Space, air on WBHM.

WSGN 

WSGN began operation as WEXP (for experiment) on February 11, 1975, primarily as a training facility for Gadsden State Community College's broadcasting department. The station was assembled using equipment donated by several Alabama radio stations and by Rick Maze of Birmingham, plus purchases from the State of Alabama Surplus Property warehouse.  Construction was performed by broadcast instructors Don Smith and Bob Mayben with assistance from WBRC-TV personnel in Birmingham.

The station was operated by students and faculty for many years. When both Smith and Mayben left the school for other interests, new instructor Neil Mullen took over the station operation and a cooperative arrangement was struck with WBHM to provide programming.

The call letters of WSGN (for founder Birmingham News, the "South's Greatest Newspaper") date back to the beginning of radio broadcasting in the state, and were formerly located in Birmingham at 610 on the AM dial. In fact, there was a WSGN-FM in the 1950s which today is known as WDJC in Birmingham. The call letters were changed under Mullens' leadership when WSGN 610 AM was sold to a company that did not want to use the call letters, but did not want another station in Birmingham to be able to use them, so another deal was struck to rename WEXP as WSGN. As of 2013, the WEXP call letters are located in Brandon, Vermont.

On September 30, 2018, WSGN ceased broadcasting programming from WBHM as Gadsden State Community College sold the license to a non-profit religious broadcaster. The sale, to Educational Media Foundation, was consummated on January 31, 2019. GSCC had discontinued its broadcasting curriculum some years earlier, leaving the school no further use for the station.

Local programs
Tapestry--Originally a weekly 30-minute program, the show spotlights aspects of Birmingham's local artistic and musical scene, as well as features interviews with artists coming through the Birmingham region, hosted by Greg Bass.  From July 2009 to 2013, the program was reduced in frequency to a 60-minute monthly broadcast. Arts-related segments on WBHM are now a part of regular news and feature shows, but Tapestry is no longer broadcast over the air. Tapestry archival programs and segments are still available on the WBHM website.

The WBHM news department has local updates inserted in Morning Edition (weekdays from 5-9 a.m.) and All Things Considered (weekdays from 3-7 p.m.).

References

External links
WBHM official website
Alabama Radio Reading Service

BHM
NPR member stations
Classical music radio stations in the United States
News and talk radio stations in the United States
Radio stations established in 1976
1976 establishments in Alabama